Azeem Majeed is a Professor and Head of the Department of Primary Care & Public Health at Imperial College, London, as well as a general practitioner in South London and a consultant in public health. In the most recent UK University Research Excellence Framework results (published in 2022), Imperial College London was the highest ranked university in the UK for the quality of research in the “Public Health, Health Services and Primary Care” unit of assessment.

Professor Majeed is a graduate of the University of Wales College of Medicine (now the Cardiff University School of Medicine). He moved to London in the 1990s and became a lecturer in the department of Epidemiology and Public Health Medicine at St. George's Hospital Medical School, followed by senior lecturer posts at the School of Public Policy and the Department of Primary Care and Population Sciences at University College London (UCL), becoming professor there in 2002 after being awarded a personal chair. He moved to Imperial College London in 2004 to take up his current post. Professor Majeed is also an honorary consultant in public health with the Imperial College Healthcare NHS Trust in London and with the UK Health Security Agency.

Professor Majeed has an international reputation for research in primary care and public health. He is Director of the National Institute for Health Research (NIHR) Applied Research Collaboration (ARC) Programme for NW London; and was associate director (Primary Care) for the NIHR Diabetes Research Network from 2005 to 2015. He spent seven years (1997-2004) working at the UK Office for National Statistics (ONS), where he acquired considerable expertise in the analysis of data from health information systems, vital statistics, NHS databases and health surveys. Professor Majeed has published over 500 academic articles; has over 150,000 citations of his work; and has an H-index of 128.He is the highest cited researcher globally in the primary care category on Google Scholar. 

His research has included a study looking at the quality of care delivered by general practices in England, and in 2021 he co-authored findings on rates of infection, serious illness and death in ethnic minority groups during the COVID-19 pandemic in the UK.

Education
Professor Majeed gained admission to the University of Wales College of Medicine (now the Cardiff University School of Medicine) to study medicine in 1980, and subsequently qualified as a medical doctor in 1985. He later worked in clinical posts in South Wales and Gloucester, completing the MRCGP (FRCGP) and MFPH (FFPH) exams. He is also a Fellow of the Royal College of Physicians. Early in his clinical career, he worked in South Wales where he saw the effects of working in the coal mining industry on health; particularly, on lung disease. He also saw the effects of poverty on ill-health. Professor Majeed completed doctoral studies and was awarded his MD by the University of Wales in 1996.

Career
Professor Majeed moved to London in the 1990s. He became a lecturer in the department of Epidemiology and Public Health Medicine at St. George's Hospital Medical School before moving to a senior lecturer post at both the School of Public Policy and the Department of Primary Care and Population Sciences at University College London (UCL). Further information on his career his available on his Imperial College Homepage. After moving to London, Professor Majeed continued his clinical work with roles in both general practice and in emergency medicine in addition to his academic work.

In 2000, he was awarded a primary care senior scientist award and subsequently concentrated on research. In 2002, he became professor at UCL. In 2004 he was appointed Professor of Primary Care & Public Health and Head of the Department of Primary Care and Public Health at Imperial College London. He still spends some time working as a general practitioner in South London.

In 2018, he completed a study demonstrating that the quality of care delivered by general practice was more important than the opening hours.

COVID-19 pandemic
In 2020, he co-authored an editorial which stated that most of the UK deaths in doctors from COVID-19 during the COVID-19 pandemic in the UK were aged over 60 and from ethnic minority backgrounds. In January 2021, during the COVID-19 vaccination programme in the United Kingdom, he relayed concerns of the distribution of COVID-19 vaccines. In the same month, he was co-author of a collaborative study between St George's University, Manchester University and Harvard University, which showed that during the pandemic "people from ethnic minority groups have experienced higher rates of infection, serious illness and death." Professor Majeed and his team have also published work on international comparisons of COVID-19 control strategies. Professor Majeed has published extensively on many areas related to COVID-19 such as vaccination and on topics such as protecting the health of medical professionals during the pandemic and returning to exercise after a COVID-19 infection.

Media Coverage and Public Health Advocacy
Professor Majeed has used his expertise in clinical medicine and public health to promote positive public health messages during the COVID-19 pandemic that will help to promote beneficial changes in behaviour at both individual and population level. He is a strong advocate of vaccination, which he believes is the best long-term method of limiting the impact of COVID-19 in the UK and the rest of the world. He has given many interviews about the COVID-19 pandemic for the broadcast media - including for the BBC, Sky News, ITV News, Channel 4  News, Times Radio, and LBC. He has also written or contributed quotes to articles for the print media - including the Guardian, Financial Times, Sunday Times, the Independent and the Daily Mirror. He has also worked with the NHS at local and national level to promote positive public health messages in areas such as wearing face masks,  following government COVID-19 regulations, and vaccination. Professor Majeed publishes articles regularly about his research and topical public health issues on his Imperial College Blog. He also published regular updates on Twitter. Professor Majeed's team has a wide range of work on societal engagement; for example, working with local schools to support children from deprived backgrounds enter the health professions, addressing vaccine hesitancy, and improving confidence and uptake of vaccination in marginalised groups.

Career Awards
Professor Majeed was selected as one of the 50 most influential GPs in the UK by the professional GP magazine Pulse for five consecutive years (2015, 2016, 2017, 2018 and 2019). In 2017, he won the Lambeth CCG Award for Outstanding Contribution to Primary Care, which reflects the contribution he has made to primary care in Lambeth in his 20 years as a GP, in addition to his national and international roles. In 2020, he was appointed as an NIHR Senior Investigator. He was one of the Imperial College London Team awarded the Queen’s Anniversary Prize for Research in 2021 for work on the UK’s response to Covid-19. Professor Majeed was also the Winner of the 1992 Winfield Medical Audit Prize. Member's of Professor Majeed's department have also won numerous awards; including from Imperial College.

Selected publications
 (Joint author)
 (Joint author)
For a Full list of Professor Majeed's publications, see his Google Scholar profile. A list of his publications on COVID-19 can also be viewed via Google Scholar.

References

External links 

Prof Azeem Majeed on the changing epidemiology of COVID-19 and risk to older people.

Living people
Academics of Imperial College London
Alumni of the University of Wales
Academics of University College London
Physicians of St George's Hospital
British public health doctors
British general practitioners
Fellows of the Faculty of Public Health
Year of birth missing (living people)
NIHR Senior Investigators